Chilean Uruguayans are people born in Chile who live in Uruguay, or Uruguayan-born people of Chilean descent.

Overview
Many Chilean-born people live in Uruguay, for a number of reasons. Both countries are located in the Southern Cone and share the Spanish language; their historical origins are common (part of the Spanish Empire); circulation is relatively easy. Uruguay is a small, quiet country, with wide beaches on the Atlantic Ocean, so some well-off Chileans choose Uruguay as their usual holiday destination, some of them even as permanent residence. Chilean students have to pay high university fees in their country, so they come to Uruguay seeking a free university education. Other Chileans of a lower social condition come to Uruguay in search of job opportunities, as part of a big inflow of Latin Americans migrating to Uruguay.

The 2011 Uruguayan census revealed 1,682 people who declared Chile as their country of birth. As of 2013, there are some 311 Chileans citizens registered in the Uruguayan social security.

Notable Chileans in Uruguay
 Elías Figueroa (born 1946 in Valparaíso) – football player, Peñarol
 Ignacio Prieto (born 1943 in Santiago) – football player, Nacional

See also

Chile–Uruguay relations
Uruguayans in Chile
Immigration to Uruguay

References

Immigration to Uruguay
Ethnic groups in Uruguay
 
Uruguay